Cheyenne National Forest was established in Wyoming by the U.S. Forest Service on July 1, 1908 with  from part of Medicine Bow National Forest and all of Crow Creek National Forest. On July 1, 1910 a portion was eliminated and the remainder renamed Medicine Bow National Forest.

References

External links
Forest History Society
Forest History Society:Listing of the National Forests of the United States Text from Davis, Richard C., ed. Encyclopedia of American Forest and Conservation History. New York: Macmillan Publishing Company for the Forest History Society, 1983. Vol. II, pp. 743-788.

Former National Forests of Wyoming